Konstantin Kravchuk and Dawid Olejniczak were the defending champions, but they chose to not participate this year.
Nicolas Mahut and Édouard Roger-Vasselin won in the final 7–6(6), 6–7(7), [10–5], against Ivan Dodig and Lukáš Rosol.

Seeds

Draw

Draw

External links
 Main Draw

BH Telecom Indoors - Doubles
2010 Doubles